The Lutheran Church in the Philippines is a Lutheran denomination in the Philippines. It was founded by Lutheran Church–Missouri Synod missionaries in 1957.

The Lutheran Church in the Philippines is a member of the Lutheran World Federation, which it joined in 1973, and of the International Lutheran Council. It is also a member of the National Council of Churches in the Philippines. The church's president is Antonio del Rio Reyes.

References

External links 
Official website

Lutheran World Federation listing
International Lutheran Council listing

Lutheran denominations
Lutheran World Federation members
International Lutheran Council members
1957 establishments in the Philippines
Christian organizations established in 1957
Lutheran denominations established in the 20th century
Lutheranism in Asia
Protestantism in the Philippines